Mamta Sharma  is an Indian politician and former chairperson of the National Commission for Women India.

Political life
Sharma was a two term member of the Rajasthan Legislative Assembly winning from the Bundi constituency in 1998 and 2003 on an Indian National Congress ticket.

References

External links
Chairpersons of the Commission since its inception

21st-century Indian women politicians
21st-century Indian politicians
Indian National Congress politicians from Rajasthan
Living people
Women members of the Rajasthan Legislative Assembly
People from Bundi
Rajasthan MLAs 2003–2008
Rajasthan MLAs 1998–2003
Year of birth missing (living people)